Dina Brodsky (born 1981) is an American Contemporary realist miniaturist, painter, and curator. She is also a social media influencer and has over 415,000 followers on Instagram, as of January 2021. She is currently represented by Garvey|Simon in New York.

Biography

Born in Minsk, Belarus, Brodsky moved to the USA in 1991 and grew up in Brookline, Massachusetts. She studied at the University of Massachusetts, Amherst, before earning her MFA at the New York Academy of Art. She currently lives in New York City.  In addition to being an artist and curating, she has taught privately, and in several institutions, including the Brookline Center for the Arts and the Metropolitan Museum of Art.

Bird by Bird 
Brodsky has a large and loyal following on Instagram, and as a result, began a global project called "Bird by Bird" in which photographers from all over the world send her images of interesting birds. Dina paints each animal (in some cases more than one) with amazing precision in an intimate format that results in jewel-like fact and fantasy. The works measure from 1.5 x 1.5 inches to 9 x 7 inches (framed 5 x 5 in. to 13 x 11 in.) and, when viewed closely, belie their tiny scale with obsessive detail that invites lingering.

The artist states about this body of work:Many years ago, I fell in love with Islamic miniatures, as well as medieval manuscript illumination, and tried to experiment with some of the techniques those artists used. My fascination with birds has primarily come from personal experience - watching an elderly woman feed pigeons every morning over a bridge - and the frequent occurrence of birds in my favorite poems. Birds have been appearing in my paintings and sketchbooks ever since I started painting. I’ve included birds in my paintings as a stand-in for people. This project is based on a Pablo Neruda quote that says, “bird by bird, I learned to know the earth.” To me, it is a way of discovering the world through a single window.These paintings have been exhibited by Garvey|Simon at the Art on Paper Fair. In 2023, they will be exhibited at Art Market San Francisco.

One More Shelter
One More Shelter is a series of small paintings, considered miniatures, that Brodsky commenced in 2012. She traveled throughout the United States to discover and visit the abandoned homes and buildings that are depicted in this series of paintings. The abandoned interiors, in disarray, are congruous to the artist's plight to the United States from the former Soviet Union with her family. The decay also contrasts with the hopeful future their inhabitants once had for these abandoned homes. In some paintings, a glimmer of hope is symbolized by birds or light penetrating the dilapidated windows of each interior. The exhibition has been reviewed in The Journal Mag, Streetlight Magazine, Fusion, and Fine Art Connoisseur.

Cycling Guide to Lilliput
Started in 2013, Cycling Guide to Lilliput is a series of paintings of the Northern German countryside that Brodsky painted while on a several months long solo cycling trip. All the paintings are on tondo or round plexiglass panels measuring 2 inches in diameter. Brodsky exhibited this series in a solo exhibition in 2015 at Island Weiss Gallery in New York City. With these small paintings, Brodsky marries traditional Northern Renaissance painting techniques to representations of the contemporary Northern German countryside.

Secret Life of Trees
In 2016, Brodsky asked hundreds of thousands of followers of her various social media outlets, including Facebook and Instagram, to send her photos of trees and corresponding stories. Each story was personal and kept secret by the artist. Using mostly these photos as references for her drawings, Brodsky started the series called The Secret Life of Trees comprising over 100 drawings of trees, all no larger than 11 x 14 inches and some as small as 3 x 5 inches. Some drawings were done only in ballpoint pen, while others were also painted with oil paint. Brodsky exhibited this series in a solo exhibition in 2016 at Bernarducci Meisel Gallery in New York City.

Curatorial Projects
Brodsky is an avid curator and has curated several noteworthy exhibitions such as 'Point of Origin' at the Lodge Gallery in 2015, followed by 'Palette' at Abend Gallery in Denver, CO. and 'Sketchbook Vol. 1' at Sugarlift Gallery in 2019, both in New York City.

'Point of Origin' and 'Palette'
Point of Origin is a group exhibition curated by Brodsky, in 2015, that included paintings by 50 artists, all of which, were on a painter's palette. Painter's palettes are a glimpse into how an artist mixes their paints. They are the origin of the painting, so-to-speak. Some of the artists included in the exhibition were Steven Assael, Alonsa Guevara, Marshall Jones, Alex Kanevsky, Tim Lowly, and Daniel Maidman.

Brodsky continued the curatorial project, curating a second group exhibition of painter's palettes at Abend Gallery in Denver, CO. The exhibition, entitled 'Palette' opened in 2017. The exhibition included paintings on palettes by Steven Assael, Alonsa Guevara, F. Scott Hess, Daniel Maidman, and many more.

Sketchbook Vol. 1
Sketchbook Vol. 1 is a group exhibition curated by Brodsky, in 2019, that included 14 sketchbooks, by 14 different artists, that were on view for visitors to peruse. These sketchbooks are not for sale. The goal of the exhibition is to introduce the artist's process to the viewer because sketchbooks are used by artists a tool to document their artistic ideas. The exhibition is on view at Sugarlift Gallery in Long Island City. The exhibition included sketchbooks by David Morales, Diana Corvelle, Dilleen Marsh, Paul Heaston, Dina Brodsky, Evan Kitson, Guno Park, Joshua Henderson, Luis Colan, Marshall Jones, Nicolas V. Sanchez, Sarah Sager, Ted Schmidt, and Vi Luong.

Private Collections 
Private collectors who own Brodsky paintings include HRH Prince of Wales, Kip Forbes, Brooke Shields, and Eileen Guggenheim.

Exhibition Reviews 
 Dina Brodsky at the Mµseum, reviewed by the Huffington Post, 2013
 Miniature & Majestic, reviewed by Fine Art Connoisseur, 2014
 Voyeur, reviewed by Art Daily, 2014
 Looking out, Looking in, reviewed by American Art Collector magazine
 Cycling Guide to Lilliput, reviewed by Brooklyn Rail

References

External links 
 
 Dina Brodsky at Garvey|Simon 
Dina Brodsky at Beinart Gallery Available art & bio
 Brodsky at the Mark Miller Gallery

Living people
1981 births
Soviet emigrants to the United States
New York Academy of Art alumni
21st-century American painters
American women painters
Jewish American artists
21st-century American women artists
Artists from Minsk
University of Massachusetts Amherst alumni
People from Brookline, Massachusetts
21st-century American Jews